La Verite (24 May 2017 – 9 February 2022) was a Swedish-bred American standardbred sired by Swedish champion Readly Express.

Background 
La Verite was a bay gelding sired by Readly Express and his grandsire was French champion trotter Ready Cash. La Verite's dam, Bardot Boko was sired by Dream Vacation. He was bred and owned in Sweden by Kontio Stable AB, and was sent to training with Katja Melkko.

Racing career

2021: four-year-old season
During his four-year-old season he raced 10 times with a record of 5-2-0.

2022: five-year-old season
As a four-year-old he took two victories in a row. In the race, driver Jorma Kontio felt that something was wrong with La Verite, that went down in the middle of the race. La Verite later died at the track, at the age of 4.

Pedigree

References

2017 racehorse births
2022 racehorse deaths
Swedish standardbred racehorses